"Judas" is a short story by John Brunner from Harlan Ellison's anthology Dangerous Visions. The story examines a modern allegory of the Biblical figure of Judas.

Reception
Algis Budrys called it "sophomoric".

Translations
 Romanian: Iuda (2013)

References

External links 

1967 short stories
Science fiction short stories
Dangerous Visions short stories
Cultural depictions of Judas Iscariot